Muaythai at the 2013 Asian Indoor and Martial Arts Games was held in Incheon, South Korea at the Dowon Gymnasium. It took place from 29 June to 2 July 2013.

Medalists

Men

Women

Medal table

Results

Men

54 kg

57 kg

63.5 kg

67 kg

71 kg

75 kg

Women

51 kg

 Mastaneh Seifabadi of Iran originally finished 5th, but was disqualified after she tested positive for Drostanolone.

54 kg

60 kg

References

External links 
 Official site

2013 Asian Indoor and Martial Arts Games events
2013
Indoor and Martial Arts Games
Indoor and Martial Arts Games